Sutton Community Academy (formerly Sutton Centre Community College) is a coeducational secondary school and sixth form with academy status, located in Sutton-in-Ashfield, Nottinghamshire, England.

History

Early plans
Sutton in Ashfield Urban District councillors in 1966 looked at the possibility of  a technical-grammar school between Sutton and Huthwaite. By 1969, the school was to be an eight form comprehensive, but the councillors still preferred and expected a technical grammar school, due to the town's textile industry. Quarrydale Comprehensive had opened, but the Sutton Urban councillors saw this type of school as more of an up-to-date secondary modern school with improved buildings. The councillors did not believe that comprehensive schools offered the relevant technical knowledge which they were mostly looking for. Comprehensive school plans in the 1960s were much more favoured by radical city councillors, but in towns such as Sutton-in-Ashfield, the local councillors were more traditional. The local Sutton councillors had also wanted a campus-type school on Leamington Drive, with grammar school, secondary modern school, and a secondary technical school, in the early 1950s.

The Nottinghamshire deputy director of education, James Stone, had joined from Leicestershire, which itself had adopted the community college idea in 1956. This idea was itself borrowed from the village college idea in Cambridgeshire, with joint-use buildings with adult education.

Opening
The county council built schools, and the district council built sports facilities. On 15 September 1970, both councils met and agreed to develop a joint-use school. Another meeting was held in February 1971, between the Labour district and the Conservative county council. At the end of April 1971, the scheme was approved by Nottinghamshire Education Committee. £30,000 came from the district council for the building, and construction started in January 1972 by Searsons Ltd, under the CLASP building technique. The headteacher was the former head of Geography at Rushcliffe Technical Grammar School for Boys.

Attainment
The school (intentionally) only offered CSEs, not O-levels. By the 1990s, it was a failing school.

Rogue teachers in the 1970s
The headteacher took on a teacher suspended by another Mansfield comprehensive school, for supporting a protest by fifth form girls over a ban on wearing trousers. Father of three, Manuel Moreno (born 1945 in Paddington), had been a teacher for six years. He taught Environmental Studies and Personal Relationships, and ended up regaling descriptive accounts of his adolescent sexual forays, as a discussion for 16 year olds in a lesson. 29 year old Manuel Moreno (on a £3,000 salary) was inevitably sacked on Monday 2 December 1974, after a governors meeting. Terry Lovell of The People had read his essay, which he described as depraved, littered with four-letter words. It described a sordid sex act in a kitchen with a girl of 17, 
and how his school friends had exposed themselves to a woman teacher in a classroom. A psychiatrist looked at the essay, and said that it dealt exclusively with violent sexuality, and introduced sex in a brutal manner. The editor of the Sunday People described its contents
as 'repulsive'.

Moreno appealed to Nottinghamshire Education Committee, and the industrial tribunal case in Nottingham, overseen by former Conservative MP Michael Coulson on Wednesday 21 May 1975 made national newspapers in May 1975.

In 1977, teacher Alan Beardsley (1948-2014) gave a lesson about swear words for lesbians, homosexuals and sexual acts to 13 year olds in a Personal Relationships lesson. He retired in 2002.

Visits
On Wednesday 9 November 1983, Princess Margaret visited, after visiting a nearby hosiery factory.

Academy
The school was awarded dual Specialist Business and Enterprise College and Arts College status, before becoming an academy in January 2013.

School performance
As of 2021, the school's most recent inspection by Ofsted was in 2019, with a judgement of Inadequate. A new principal and senior leadership team were put in place in 2021, and Ofsted found that the school was improving.

References

External links
Sutton Community Academy official website

Academies in Nottinghamshire
Sutton-in-Ashfield
Secondary schools in Nottinghamshire